McKees Rocks, also known as "The Rocks", is a borough in Allegheny County in Western Pennsylvania, United States, along the south bank of the Ohio River. Part of the Pittsburgh metropolitan area, its population was 5,920 at the time of the 2020 census.

The borough is within the Sto-Rox School District, which serves McKees Rocks and neighboring Stowe Township. The local high school is Sto-Rox High School.

The Pittsburgh, Allegheny and McKees Rocks Railroad is located in an area along the river known as the "Bottoms".

McKees Rocks has one of the largest Indian mounds in the state, built by the Adena and Hopewell peoples a thousand years before Europeans entered the area.

In the past, the city was known for its extensive iron and steel interests. There were large railroad machine shops and manufacturers of locomotives and freight and passenger cars. Other factories produced springs, enamel ware, lumber, wall materials, plaster, nuts and bolts, malleable castings, chains and forgings, tin ware, concrete, and cigars.

McKees Rocks is also known as the birthplace of former Ohio Governor John Kasich and late television salesperson Billy Mays.

History
For thousands of years, Native Americans inhabited the region. The Adena culture built a large earthwork mound here, which was a burial site. It was augmented in later years by members of the Hopewell culture. This was the largest such mound in the state. The Carnegie Museum of Natural History excavated half the mound in 1896. Its archaeologists traced the construction history and unearthed the remains of 33 people. The mound crowned a high bluff that overlooks Chartiers Creek and the Ohio River. The bluff under the mound was quarried for municipal paving some time after the archaeological dig, eliminating what remained of the Indian burial site. This site was considered by George Washington as a possible location for Fort Pitt, which he eventually ordered built on the site of the destroyed French Fort Duquesne in what is now Pittsburgh's Point State Park.

Around 1749, the French-Canadian explorer Pierre Joseph Celoron de Blainville visited the area and discovered a "written rock" inscribed with markings he believed were made by Native Americans. Celeron named the place after the rock, and it eventually became known as McKees Rocks. Writing in 1918, historian John Boucher stated that the inscriptions had "long since faded away, if indeed they were anything other than marks made by English fur traders."

The borough derives its name from trader Alexander McKee, who also served as an Indian agent. He was given a  tract of land in 1764 for his services during the French and Indian War. The name also related to a rocky projection into the river at this site. In 1769, the name McKees Rocks was placed on an official deed, and that year is considered to be its founding date. In 1892, it was incorporated as a borough. In 1900, 6,353 people resided in the borough; in 1910, 14,702; in 1920, 16,713; and in 1940, 17,021 people inhabited McKees Rocks. After industrial restructuring caused a loss of jobs in the city, the population declined, to 6,104 at the 2010 census.

Mann's Hotel, which was possibly one of the oldest buildings in the Pittsburgh area, was located at 23 Singer Avenue in McKees Rocks. It was believed to have been built around 1803, although some sources put the construction in the 18th century. It is rumored that George Washington stayed there when he was surveying the Indian mound. On October 12, 2009, Mann's Hotel was condemned due to neglect and had to be demolished because of its deteriorating condition.

McKees Rocks was the site of one of the pivotal labor conflicts of the early 20th century, the 1909 McKees Rocks Strike. In the summer and early fall of 1909, some 5,000 workers of the Pressed Steel Car Company's plant at McKees Rocks went on strike, joined by 3,000 others who worked for the Standard Steel Car Company of Butler and others in New Castle. The strike, led by organizers of the Industrial Workers of the World (IWW), was repressed by armed security guards and the state militia, resulting in at least a dozen deaths. The conflict involved participants on both sides.

In 1940, three decapitated bodies were found in boxcars in McKees Rocks during a routine train inspection. The train cars had apparently come from Youngstown. In fact, throughout the 1920s, various dismembered and decapitated bodies were recovered in or around the nearby swamp areas of New Castle and McKees Rocks. Despite similarities to a series of murders that had occurred in Cleveland during the same time period, the murders were never solved or officially connected to the killings in Ohio.

Geography
McKees Rocks is located at  (40.470218, -80.063674).

Points of interest
The multimillion-dollar,  Father Ryan Cultural Arts Center opened in 2008, at 420 Chartiers Avenue, adjacent to the F.O.R. Sto-Rox Library (at 500 Chartiers Avenue). It offers many creative and performing arts courses to the public.

The "Bottoms" neighborhood is the site of the McKees Rocks Indian Mound, designated as a National Historic Landmark. The oldest human bones in eastern North America have been discovered here during an excavation.

Surrounding and adjacent neighborhoods
McKees Rocks is made up of several neighborhoods, such as West Park, Meyers Ridge, and "The Bottoms". McKees Rocks has two borders by land: Kennedy Township to the west and Stowe Township to the north. Chartiers Creek separates McKees Rocks from two Pittsburgh neighborhoods and have connectors to both:
Windgap to the southwest via Wind Gap Bridge. However, this is not a direct connection as a very small border of Kennedy Township separates the two communities in the middle of the bridge.
Esplen to the south and southeast via Linden Ave. Bridge
Across the Ohio River, McKees Rocks runs adjacent to two other Pittsburgh neighborhoods:
Brighton Heights to the northeast via McKees Rocks Bridge. As with Wind Gap, this is not a direct connection as Stowe Township separates the two neighborhoods in the middle of the bridge.
Marshall-Shadeland to the southeast and under the east end of the bridge

Demographics

As of the census of 2000, there were 6,622 people, 2,905 households, and 1,652 families residing in the borough. The population density was 6,377.5 people per square mile (2,458.4/km2). There were 3,402 housing units at an average density of 3,276.4 per square mile (1,263.0/km2). The racial makeup of the borough was 82.71% White, 14.06% African American, 0.26% Native American, 0.68% Asian, 0.03% Pacific Islander, 0.41% from other races, and 1.86% from two or more races. Hispanic or Latino of any race were 1.09% of the population.

The census of 2010 revealed there were 6,104 residents. The population density was 6003.25 people per square mile. The racial makeup of the borough was 62.17% White, 35.26% African American, 0.57% Asian, and 0.34% from other races. Hispanic or Latino of any race were 1.65% of the population.

There were 2,905 households, out of which 26.0% had children under the age of 18 living with them, 29.4% were married couples living together, 21.3% had a female householder with no husband present, and 43.1% were non-families. 37.8% of all households were made up of individuals, and 17.2% had someone living alone who was 65 or older. The average household size was 2.24 and the average family size was 2.96.

The population included 24.1% under the age of 18, 7.8% from 18 to 24, 28.3% from 25 to 44, 20.9% from 45 to 64, and 19.0% who were 65 or older. The median age was 38. For every 100 females, there were 89.1 males; for every 100 females age 18 and over, there were 84.2 males.

The median income for a household in the borough was $22,278, and the median income for a family was $29,063. Males had a median income of $25,872 versus $23,402 for females. The per capita income for the borough was $13,858. About 20.5% of families and 25.3% of the population were below the poverty line, including 38.8% of those under age 18 and 17.0% of those age 65 or over.

Notable people

Myron Brown, Slippery Rock University basketball star and NBA player
Tom Clements, quarterbacks coach of the Green Bay Packers
Chuck Fusina, Penn State, USFL, and NFL football player
Damar Hamlin, NFL player for the Buffalo Bills
John Kasich, 69th Governor of Ohio from 2011 to 2019, former Congressman, and presidential candidate in 2000 and 2016
Catherine Baker Knoll, 30th Lieutenant Governor of Pennsylvania (2003-2008)
Carl Kosak, author
Al Kozar, Major League Baseball infielder
Ted Kwalick, Penn State all-America football player and San Francisco 49ers all-Pro tight end; member of the College Football Hall of Fame
Bob Ligashesky, special teams coordinator for the Syracuse Orange
Billy Mays, television pitchman and Oxi-Clean spokesman, known for his bearded face and distinct voice.
Jeff Smith, cartoonist, best known as the creator of the self-published comic book series Bone
Paul Spadafora, former IBF world lightweight boxing champion, known as the "Pittsburgh Kid"
Olive Thomas, silent film actress, and the original flapper

In popular culture
McKees Rocks is the fictional setting of the novels Duffy's Rocks by Edward Fenton, Riot by William Trautmann, and more than a dozen novels by the crime writer K. C. Constantine.

See also
List of cities and towns along the Ohio River
Pressed Steel Car Strike of 1909
Jenny Lee Bakery
Hachmeister-Lind

Gallery

References

External links
 
 Community Development Corporation
 Sto-Rox School District

Pennsylvania populated places on the Ohio River
Populated places established in 1764
Pittsburgh metropolitan area
Boroughs in Allegheny County, Pennsylvania
1892 establishments in Pennsylvania